Jack Gross may refer to:
 Jack Gross (screenwriter) (1929–2007), American film screenwriter and television writer
 Jack J. Gross (1902–1964), American film and television producer
 Jack O. Gross (1905–1985), founded KFMB-TV, the first television station in San Diego
 Jack Gross (endocrinologist) (1921-1994), a Canadian-Israeli endocrinologist